Eleodes littoralis is a species of desert stink beetle in the family Tenebrionidae. It is found in California. Due to its hair, it is similar to Eleodes osculans and Eleodes nigropilosa.

References

Further reading

External links

 

Tenebrionidae